"The Ones I Love" is a song by Australian pop singer Bonnie Anderson and was released on 19 February 2016. The song became her first to enter the Billboard Dance Club Songs chart, peaking at number 43.

Upon release Anderson said "'The Ones I Love' came from a dream I had...Dreams often trigger stories and songs for me to write about. This one in particular really shook me up, it felt so real! Losing someone you love would be the hardest thing to go through, it even hurts in your dreams, which made me realise how important it is to spend time with my loved ones. This song means so much to me and I hope it resonates with others as well. I can't wait for everyone to hear it."

Music video
The music video for "The Ones I Love" was released on 26 February 2016.

Track listing
Digital single
 "The Ones I Love" - 3:20

Digital single (remixes)
 "The Ones I Love"  (radio edit)  - 3:20
 "The Ones I Love"  (DASCO Club remix)  - 6:26
 "The Ones I Love"  (Soulshaker remix)  - 6:24
 "The Ones I Love"  (Diamm remix)  - 6:05
 "The Ones I Love"  (Alinari remix)  - 5:08

Charts

Release history

References

2016 singles
2016 songs
Bonnie Anderson (singer) songs
Sony Music Australia singles
Songs written by Michael Paynter